Nikolai Pavlovich Miligulo (born 27 December 1936) is a retired artistic gymnast from Belarus. He competed at the 1960 Summer Olympics in all artistic gymnastics events and won a silver medal in the team allround competition. Individually his best result was 10th place on the pommel horse. He competed with one wrist slammed to the bones by the door of the car that brought him to the Olympic venue.

He retired around 1972 and worked as a gymnastics coach in Minsk, training such competitors as Nellie Kim. He served in the Soviet Army and retired as a lieutenant colonel. In 1991 he moved to Minneapolis, United States, and later brought his family there. His son Pavel is also a former artistic gymnast who competed internationally.

References

1936 births
Living people
Gymnasts at the 1960 Summer Olympics
Olympic gymnasts of the Soviet Union
Olympic silver medalists for the Soviet Union
Olympic medalists in gymnastics
Soviet male artistic gymnasts
Medalists at the 1960 Summer Olympics